Bill Csipkay is an American former professional tennis player.

A native of Wyckoff, New Jersey, Csipkay is the eldest of six children born to Ann and Eugene Csipkay. He played in three consecutive state championships on the Ramapo High School team and received a full scholarship to North Carolina State University, where he was a doubles partner of John Sadri. Graduating in 1979, Csipkay was ranked in the world's top 200 for doubles and appeared in the doubles main draw of the 1983 US Open, with his brother Tom.

ATP Challenger finals

Doubles: 1 (0–1)

References

External links
 
 

Year of birth missing (living people)
Living people
American male tennis players
NC State Wolfpack men's tennis players
Tennis people from New Jersey
Sportspeople from Bergen County, New Jersey
People from Wyckoff, New Jersey